Lea Hall railway station is situated in the Lea Hall area east of the city of Birmingham, in the West Midlands of England. It has two platforms, one each side of the two running lines, with no points or sidings. The ticket office is on a bridge over the tracks, which are a little below street level. The station, and all trains serving it, are operated by West Midlands Trains. Ramps have been added to permit easy disabled access to both platforms.

History

The station was designed by the architect William Henry Hamlyn and opened in 1939.

In 1998 the station was re-designed with new sculptures and colour scheme by Tim Tolkien, great nephew of writer J. R. R. Tolkien

Facilities
The station has a ticket office located on the bridge over the tracks which is open Monday-Thursday 06:15-18:00, Friday 06:00-19:00, Saturday 07:00-19:00 and Sunday 10:00-13:00. When the ticket office is open tickets must be purchased before boarding the train. Outside of these times there is a ticket machine above platform 1 which accepts card payments only - cash and voucher payments can be made to the senior conductor on the train.

There is a free car park for rail users on Lea Hall Road.

Step free access is available between the platforms via the ramp.

Services
A limited service operates beyond  towards  and  mainly at peak times and the start/end of service.

All services are operated by West Midlands Trains.

References

An Historical Survey Of Selected LMS Stations Vol. One Dr R Preston and R Powell Hendry. Oxford Pub. Co. (1982, Reprinted in 2001)

External links

Rail Around Birmingham and the West Midlands: Lea Hall railway station
Railways of Warwickshire entry

Railway stations in Birmingham, West Midlands
DfT Category E stations
Former London, Midland and Scottish Railway stations
Railway stations in Great Britain opened in 1939
Railway stations served by West Midlands Trains
William Henry Hamlyn buildings